Arbor Lodge is a neighborhood in the North section of Portland, Oregon. Interstate 5 forms the eastern boundary of the neighborhood. The south boundary is formed by Ainsworth Street, the west boundary is formed by a combination of Willamette Boulevard and Chataqua Boulevard, and the north boundary is formed by Lombard Street. The bordering neighborhoods are Piedmont to the east, Overlook to the south, University Park to the west, and Kenton to the north.

The North Lombard Transit Center and the Rosa Parks stations on the MAX Yellow Line provide light rail service to the neighborhood. Their opening in 2004 was part of a spurt of new development in the neighborhood, including a New Seasons Market and a Fred Meyer mega-store.

The neighborhood is the location of Arbor Lodge Park.

References

External links
Arbor Lodge (PortlandNeighborhood.com)
Arbor Lodge Neighborhood Association
Arbor Lodge Street Tree Inventory Report

 
Neighborhoods in Portland, Oregon